The cave physa (Physella spelunca) is a species of small, air-breathing, freshwater snail, an aquatic pulmonate gastropod mollusk in the family Physidae. It lives only in caves.

This species is endemic to Big Horn County, Wyoming.

See also
List of non-marine molluscs of the United States

References

Physidae
Freshwater animals of North America
Endemic fauna of the United States
Cave snails
Gastropods described in 1974
Taxa named by William J. Clench
Taxonomy articles created by Polbot